Aoife Scott is an Irish singer-songwriter from Dublin. She was a finalist in the Liet International song contest for minority languages in 2011.

Career
Scott's first album, released in 2016, was entitled Carry The Day.
Scott has performed on RTÉ's The Late Late Show. She has toured in the US and UK.

Her recording of Grace with cousins Danny O'Reilly and Róisín O, as part of the Centenary concert, topped the Irish iTunes chart in 2016. Her solo single All Along the Wild Atlantic Way also topped the chart.

Her album Homebird, a Radio 1 "Album of the week", was released in January 2020.

Scott was a guest judge on TG4's Réalta agus Gaolta talent show.

Personal life
Aoife is a Gaeilgeoir (Irish language speaker).

A part of the extended Black Family singers, Scott is the daughter of singer Frances Black and the sister of solo artist and producer Eoghan Scott.
, Scott has been in a relationship with musician Andy Meaney since 2014.

References

External links

Irish women singer-songwriters
Living people
Singers from Dublin (city)
Year of birth missing (living people)
20th-century Irish women singers
21st-century Irish women singers